Denyce is a feminine given name. Notable people with the name include:

Denyce Graves (born 1964), American opera singer

See also

Denyse
Denice (given name)
Denise (given name)

Feminine given names